Lake Shala (also spelled Shalla) is an alkaline lake located in the Ethiopian Rift Valley, in the Abijatta-Shalla National Park.

Overview
The lake is 28 kilometers long and 12 wide, with a surface area of 329 square kilometers. It has a maximum depth of 266 meters and is at an elevation of 1,558 meters.  As such, it is the deepest of Ethiopia's Rift Valley lakes.

Known for the sulphur springs on the lake bed, its islands are inhabited by great white pelicans, one being known as Pelican Island.

Lake Shala is surrounded by hot springs filled with boiling water, and the earth surrounding the lake is filled with cracks due to erosion and earthquakes. Due to steam rising from the boiling water in the springs, the atmosphere around the lake is relatively foggy. At the southern end of the lake, there are various species of flamingoes and birds that frequent the lake.

See also
O'a Caldera
Rift Valley lakes

References

Shala
Shala
Ethiopian Highlands
Geography of Oromia Region